Maple Town, originally titled , is a Japanese animated television franchise created by Chifude Asakura. The series takes place in an utopian city populated by animal characters, among them Patty Rabbit and Bobby Bear. Episodes of the series originally aired on TV Asahi in Japan from January 19, 1986 to December 27, 1987 and syndication and Nickelodeon in the US from April 13, 1987 to June 23, 1987.

Original series
The original Maple Town series aired from January 1986 to January 1987 on TV Asahi, spanning 52 episodes. In the U.S., the first 10 episodes were shown in syndication in April 1987 as a test run, then 16 more episodes aired on Nickelodeon in May and June.

Palm Town
A second TV series, aired in Japan during 1987. At the end of the first TV series, Patty left for Palm Town with her Aunt Jane. The second series picks up after that, with Patty living in Palm Town with Jane and her husband George, who run the Pika Clinic. The entire cast of the original series, with the exception of Patty, is absent although they do make cameo appearances.

The series lasted for 50 episodes, the last 12 of which were actually 6 two-part episodes (resulting in the common incorrect tally of 44).

References

External links
 Official Toei Maple Town Monogatari  site

Maple Town